Wadgaon Darya is a village in Parner taluka in Ahmednagar district of state of Maharashtra, India.

Religion
The majority of the population in the village is Hindu.
The language which is spoken by the inhabitants is called Marathi.
Daryabai is one of the big temples of Maharashtra and there are also monkeys, caves, various medicinal plants, water parks, and birds.

Economy
The majority of the population has farming as their primary occupation.

See also
 Parner taluka
 Villages in Parner taluka
in farmers more plantation in pea plants in their farm

References 

Villages in Parner taluka
Villages in Ahmednagar district